Chen Fei (born 30 October 1990 in Tianjin) is a Chinese judoka. She competed in the 70 kg event at the 2012 Summer Olympics.  She has competed at several world championships, and has won bronze at two Asian Games.

References

External links
 
 

1990 births
Living people
Judoka at the 2012 Summer Olympics
Olympic judoka of China
Sportspeople from Tianjin
Asian Games medalists in judo
Judoka at the 2010 Asian Games
Judoka at the 2014 Asian Games
Chinese female judoka
Asian Games bronze medalists for China
Medalists at the 2014 Asian Games
Medalists at the 2010 Asian Games
21st-century Chinese women